José Narro Céspedes (born 17 January 1959) is a Mexican politician currently affiliated with the National Regeneration Movement and serving as a senator to the LXIV Legislature of the Mexican Congress from the state of Zacatecas. As a member of the Party of the Democratic Revolution and Labor Party, he was previously a federal deputy in the LVI, LVIII and LXI Legislatures. At the state level, he served in both the Congress of Zacatecas and the Legislative Assembly of the Federal District in the 1990s.

References

1959 births
Living people
Politicians from Tamaulipas
Members of the Chamber of Deputies (Mexico)
Labor Party (Mexico) politicians
Party of the Democratic Revolution politicians
21st-century Mexican politicians
Morena (political party) politicians
People from Ciudad Mante
Universidad Autónoma Metropolitana alumni
Members of the Congress of Zacatecas
Members of the Congress of Mexico City
20th-century Mexican politicians